Chris Holt may refer to:

 Chris Holt (ice hockey) (born 1985), American hockey goaltender
 Chris Holt (pitcher) (born 1971), former Major League Baseball pitcher
 Chris Holt (baseball coach) (born 1979), Major League Baseball coach
 Chris Holt (politician), Green Party candidate in Ontario